'Birgit Bonnier' is a modern cultivar of domesticated apple which have some resistance to apple scab and mildew.

'Birgit Bonnier' was developed in Sweden through a cross between the popular 'Cortland' and the 'Lord Lambourne'. The result is an apple of a pleasant flavor. Shape is flat. Background color is whitish green and flushed or with striped with orange red. Fruit is low in juiciness making it more recommended for a dessert apple.

This cultivar was named by the Swedish publisher Albert Bonnier, who named it after his wife Birgit.

References

External links
Äpplesorter från Balsgård
 Work on storage diseases
 Pre‐breeding for Future  Challenges in Nordic Apples
 Diversity in European pome fruit genetic resources evaluated for disease resistance
 Molecular characterisation of indigenous Swedish apple cultivars based on SSR and S-allele analysis

Apple cultivars
Swedish apples